Turkmenpost (Turkmenpochta), is the national postal operator of Turkmenistan. The company is responsible for the delivery of mail and issuing postage stamps. It has been a member of the Universal Postal Union since January 26, 1993.  Turkmenpost employs about 2,000 people and  has over 146 post offices, with its headquarters in Ashgabat.

History 
Mail service has existed in Turkmenistan since the time of the Russian Empire. However, since October 1991, the country organizes its own postal service functions.

In any branch of Turkmenpochta, customers can send letters, parcels, money transfers in Turkmenistan, large-sized parcels, EMS-shipments and express transfers.

Turkmenpost provides services in five velayats, all cities and urban-type settlements of Turkmenistan.

The total number of branches of Turkmenpochta is 146. They are equipped with modern communication technology, where payments for services are accepted by non-cash method, bank cards and cash.

DHL Express is among the partners of Turkmenpost.

Building 
In Ashgabat on April 1, 2011 a Turkmenpost office, and nearby, the building of the Ministry of Communications (Turkmenistan) was constructed.

Services 
The postal company Turkmenpost  provides the following services:
 Receiving postal money orders
 Payment for postal money orders
 Receiving emails with a declared value
 Receiving sent parcels
 Receiving subscriptions
 Wire transfer
 Wholesale and retail trade (stationery and household goods)
 Receiving subscription fees and international calls
 Receiving utilities
 Other services (packaging of parcels, small packages, parcels, sewing and sale of commercial forms.)
 Delivery service, Courier call from door to door
 EMS services
 Checking traffic fines online, through the website
 Subscribing to newspapers and magazines. Possibility of online subscription through the Abuna and Turkmenmetmugat applications;

See also
Postage stamps and postal history of Turkmenistan

References

External links

Postal organizations
Postal system of Turkmenistan
Logistics companies of Turkmenistan
Transport companies established in 1992
1992 establishments in Turkmenistan